The Tunisian women's national volleyball team, nicknamed Les Aigles de Carthage (The Eagles of Carthage or The Carthage Eagles), represents Tunisia in international women's volleyball competitions and friendly matches. The team is one of the leading nations in women's volleyball in Africa.

The team lastly qualified for the 2021 Women's African Nations Volleyball Championship.

Results
 Champions   Runners up   Third place   Fourth place

Red border color indicates tournament was held on home soil.

Olympic Games

World Championship

World Cup

African Volleyball Championship

Arab Championship

Mediterranean Games

* Since 2001.

All-Africa Games

Pan Arab Games

Current squad
The following is the Tunisian roster in the 2022 Mediterranean Games

Head coach:  Mohamed Messelmani

See also
Tunisia men's national volleyball team
Tunisia women's national under-23 volleyball team
Tunisia women's national under-20 volleyball team
Tunisia women's national under-18 volleyball team
Tunisian Volleyball Federation

References

External links
Official website
FIVB profile

Volleyball
National women's volleyball teams
Volleyball in Tunisia
Women's sport in Tunisia